Emmetsburg Community School District (ECSD) is a rural public school district headquartered in Emmetsburg, Iowa.

Entirely in Palo Alto County, it serves Emmetsburg, Curlew, and Cylinder.

History

It has a partial day sharing agreement with the Ruthven-Ayrshire Community School District.

Schools
 Emmetsburg High School
 In 2017, the district had 229 high school students. That year, Dan Voigt of the Emmetsburg News stated that the enrollment size "puts them in the upper echelon of the Twin Lakes schools" athletic division.
 Emmetsburg Middle School
 West Elementary School

Emmetsburg High School

Athletics
The E-Hawks compete in the Twin Lakes Conference in the following sports:

Cross Country 
Volleyball 
Football 
9-time State Champions (1977, 1979, 1989, 1990, 1997, 2000, 2002, 2003, 2008)
Basketball
 Girls 1991 6v6 State Champions 
Wrestling 
 12-time State Champions (1976, 1977, 1978, 1982, 1985, 2000, 2001, 2002, 2003, 2005, 2006) 
 2-time Class 2A State Duals Champions (2000, 2003)
Track and Field
Golf 
 Boys' 2006 Class 2A State Champions
Baseball 
 2001 Class 2A State Champions 
Softball

See also
List of school districts in Iowa
List of high schools in Iowa

References

External links
 Emmetsburg Community School District

School districts in Iowa
Education in Palo Alto County, Iowa